Ramona Quimby, Age 8 (1981) is a novel by Beverly Cleary in the Ramona series. Ramona Quimby is in the third grade, now at a new school, and making some new friends. With Beezus in Jr. High and Mr. Quimby going back to college, Ramona feels the pressure with everyone counting on her to manage at school by herself and get along with Willa Jean after school every day. Ramona Quimby, Age 8 was named a Newbery Honor book in 1982.

Plot summary 
This book is about Ramona Quimby's life in 3rd Grade. The schools in Ramona Quimby's neighborhood have been reorganized, and now she gets to ride the bus to Cedarhurst Primary, where she and her fellow third graders will be the biggest kids in the school. Ramona is happy about the changes until a boy on the bus steals her new eraser, but she rises to the challenge and ends up deciding that "Yard Ape" (the boy who stole her eraser, known as "Danny" to adults) may not be so bad, after all.

Ramona feels the best part of being in third grade is Sustained Silent Reading. When Ramona cracks a hard boiled egg on her head at lunch—and finds out her mother forgot to boil it—she ends up in the secretary's office with a head full of raw egg, where she overhears Mrs. Whaley describe her as a show-off and a nuisance. Even Yard Ape can't make her feel better about that. Things get worse when she suddenly becomes ill and throws up in class, followed by her mother leaving work to take her home.

For Ramona, there's also the problem of spoiled Willa Jean. Every day after school Howie goes outside to ride bikes with his friends, and Ramona is forced to play baby games with Willa Jean. Beezus can always say she's busy doing homework, but that doesn't work for Ramona.

At one point, Mr. Quimby has had enough of the gloom on one Sunday and insists the family go out to eat so they go to Ramona's favorite restaurant. When they arrive, Ramona begins to dance when she accidentally bumps into an older gentleman who salutes her. Embarrassed, she goes back and joins her family. Just before her family is about to leave, they are delighted that the older gentleman Ramona bumped into paid for their meal because he felt sad about his own family whom he hadn't seen in a while.

Critical reception

Critics welcomed the latest volume in this series, praising Cleary's ability to convey the real concerns of ordinary children with clarity and sensitivity. The Children's Literature review says, "Kids may easily identify with Ramona's difficulties, as Cleary depicts this 'typical' white American middle-class family with warmth and interest. Cleary tackles the difficult issue of describing a happy family with grace; the Quimby family is far from perfect, and although not poverty-stricken, they are also far from rich."

Kirkus Reviews agree that readers will identify with Ramona, writing "Though the family has its money worries and its cranky days, things are never so bad that a Sunday dinner at the Whopperburger can't cheer them up... As always, Ramona's thought processes are amusing, touching, and revealing. Once more, Cleary shows us life through Ramona's eyes and shows her young readers that they are not alone."

In 1986, Choosing Books for Kids included Ramona Quimby, Age 8 in its list of Ten Books for Eights and Nines Too Good to Miss, and says "Cleary paints a real world kids can readily relate to."

Editions

The book has been translated into Spanish, with the title Ramona empieza el curso. It has also been translated into Afrikaans, Bulgarian, Chinese, Dutch, German (with the title Ramona oder Eine wirklich nette Familie), Hebrew, Hungarian (with the title Ramona), Japanese, Korean, Persian, Thai, and Turkish.

References

External links

1981 American novels
American children's novels
Novels by Beverly Cleary
Novels set in Portland, Oregon
Newbery Honor-winning works
1981 children's books
Children's novels